The Super NES CD-ROM System (commonly shortened as the SNES-CD), known as the Super Famicom CD-ROM Adapter in Japan, is an unreleased add-on for the Super Nintendo Entertainment System (SNES) video game console. It built upon the functionality of the cartridge-based SNES by adding support for a CD-ROM-based format known as Super Disc.

The SNES-CD was developed in a joint venture between Nintendo and Sony. As well as the SNES add-on, Sony planned to release it as a hybrid console, the PlayStation, similar to Sharp's Twin Famicom and NEC's TurboDuo. Another partnership with Philips yielded a few Nintendo-themed games for the CD-i platform instead of the SNES-CD. 

After the SNES-CD was canceled, Sony developed its own console using the PlayStation name. The first PlayStation console became the chief competitor of Nintendo's next console, the Nintendo 64.

History

Sony engineer Ken Kutaragi became interested in working with video games after seeing his daughter play games on Nintendo's Famicom video game console. He took on a contract at Sony for developing hardware that would drive the audio subsystem of Nintendo's next console, the Super NES. Kutaragi secretly developed the chip, the Sony SPC 700. As Sony was uninterested in the video game business, most of his superiors did not approve of the project, but Kutaragi found support in Sony executive Norio Ohga and the project was allowed to continue. The success of the project spurred Nintendo to enter into a partnership with Sony to develop both a CD-ROM add-on for the Super NES and a Sony-branded console that would play both SNES cartridges, as well as games released for the new Super Disc format.

Development of the format started in 1988, when Nintendo signed a contract with Sony to produce a CD-ROM add-on for the SNES. The system was to be compatible with existing SNES games as well as games released for the Super Disc format. Under their agreement, Sony would develop and retain control over the Super Disc format, with Nintendo thus effectively ceding a large amount of control of software licensing to Sony. Further, Sony would also be the sole benefactor of licensing related to music and movies software that it had been aggressively pursuing as a secondary application. Nintendo president Hiroshi Yamauchi was already wary of Sony at this point and deemed it unacceptable, as Sony was the sole provider of the audio chip, the S-SMP, used in the SNES and required developers to pay for an expensive development tool from Sony. 

Furthermore, Yamauchi started to see a more favorable partner in Philips, one of Sony's largest competitors. To counter the proposed agreement, Yamauchi sent Nintendo of America president Minoru Arakawa (his son-in-law) and executive Howard Lincoln to the Netherlands to negotiate a more favorable contract with Philips. As described by David Sheff in his book Game Over, "[The Philips deal] was meant to do two things at once: give Nintendo back its stranglehold on software and gracefully fuck Sony." At the June 1991 Consumer Electronics Show, Sony announced its SNES-compatible cartridge/CD console, the PlayStation. The next day, Nintendo revealed its partnership with Philips at the show—a surprise to the entire audience, including Sony.

While Nintendo and Sony attempted to resolve their differences, between two and three hundred prototypes of the PlayStation were created, and software for the system was being developed. In 1992, a deal was reached allowing Sony to produce SNES-compatible hardware, with Nintendo retaining control and profit over the games. The organizations never repaired their rift. By the next year, Sony had dropped further development of the Super NES CD-ROM to develop its own console for the next generation, the PlayStation.

Prototype

In November 2015, it was reported that one of the original Nintendo PlayStation prototypes had been found. The prototype was reportedly left behind by former Sony Computer Entertainment CEO Ólafur Jóhann Ólafsson during his time at Advanta. A former Advanta worker (Terry Diebold) acquired the device as part of a lot during Advanta's 2009 bankruptcy auction. The system was later confirmed as operational and the unit plays Super Famicom cartridges as well as the test cartridge that accompanied the unit, although the audio output and CD drive were non-functional. Some groups attempted to develop homebrew software for the console, such as Super Boss Gaiden, as there were no known games that used the CD drive.

The prototype came with a Sony/PlayStation-branded version of the standard Super Famicom controller (model number SHVC-005). In March 2016, retro-gaming website RetroCollect reported that they (and influential members of online emulation communities) had received (from an anonymous source) a functional disc boot ROM for the SNES-CD.

Diebold had given the unit to Benjamin Heckendorn, a console modder, to look at, around 2017. Heckendorn provided a tear-down video of the system, through which he was able to identify faults in several on-board components that he subsequently replaced, which resulted in fixing the audio and CD drive issues indirectly. Heckendorn showed audio CDs working on the system, as there were no known game CDs, but affirmed that homebrew games worked.

Technical specifications
Heckendorn's July 2016 teardown video provides technical specifications of the prototype. Heckendorn said the system would have probably been as powerful as a standard Super NES, but not as powerful as the Sega CD. The standalone unit has the following connectors: two Super NES controller ports, a cartridge slot, a dual-speed CD-ROM drive, RCA composite jacks, S-Video, RFU DC OUT (similar to the PlayStation SCPH-1001), a proprietary multi-out AV output port (the same one featured on the Super NES, Nintendo 64, and GameCube), headphone jack on the front, a serial port labelled "NEXT" (probably for debugging), and one expansion port under the unit. The specifications from the prototype are different from those published in the March 1993 edition of Electronic Gaming Monthly.

Legacy
After the original contract with Sony failed, Nintendo continued its partnership with Philips. This contract provisioned Philips with the right to feature Nintendo's characters in a few games for its CD-i multimedia device, but never resulted in a CD-ROM add-on for the SNES. Witnessing the poor reception of the Sega CD, Nintendo cancelled plans for the add-on. The Nintendo-themed CD-i games were very poorly received, and the CD-i itself is considered a commercial failure. The main game in development for the SNES-CD platform launch was Square's Secret of Mana, whose planned content was cut down to the size suitable for cartridge and released on that medium instead.

Kutaragi and Sony continued to develop their own console and released the PlayStation in December 1994 in Japan and September in North America and Europe the following year. The CD-based console successfully competed with Nintendo's cartridge-based Nintendo 64 and other CD-based console systems such as the  Fujitsu FM Towns Marty, the NEC PC-FX, the SNK Neo Geo CD, the Panasonic 3DO Interactive Multiplayer and the Sega Saturn, causing it to become the console leader due to its success. The broken partnership with Sony has often been cited as a mistake on Nintendo's part, effectively creating a formidable rival in the video game market. Nintendo would not release an optical disc-based console of its own until the release of the GameCube in 2001.

See also 
 Atari Jaguar CD
 Panasonic M2, Initially announced as an add-on chip for the 3DO
 Satellaview
 Sega CD, a CD-ROM attachment for the Sega Genesis
 TurboGrafx-16, the first video game console with a CD-ROM drive attachment (see CD-ROM add-ons section)

References

External links 
 

1990s in video gaming
CD-ROM-based consoles
Fourth-generation video game consoles
Home video game consoles
Sony consoles
Super Nintendo Entertainment System
PlayStation (brand)
PlayStation (console)
Vaporware game consoles
Video game console add-ons